The Taipei Metro Touqianzhuang station is a station on the Xinzhuang Line located in Xinzhuang District, New Taipei, Taiwan. The station opened for service on 5 January 2012. The elevated Circular line platforms opened on 31 January 2020.

Station overview

This three-level, underground station has an island platform and two side platforms. It is located beneath the intersection of Zhongzheng Rd. and Siyuan Rd. It was scheduled to open in March 2012 along with most of the Xinzhuang Line, but opened earlier for service on 5 January 2012.

It is a transfer station with the Circular Line, which has 2 elevated platforms. It opened on 31 January 2020.

Construction
The platform is  meters long. It has six entrances, one accessibility elevator, and two vent shafts. Two of the entrances are connected with an existing pedestrian underpass.

The station is constructed under the existing Siyuan Road pedestrian passage. In addition, the location of the station includes many utility pipelines that could not be relocated. Thus, due to the limited construction area, the station was not constructed using the cut-and-cover method employed in other stations. Instead, construction used the pipe jacking method from sidewalks, outer lanes of roads, and the spaces between Dahan Bridge piers.

Design
The theme for the station is "Thousands of sails: North Taiwan's Xinzhuang port". Entrances are constructed from glass, steel frames, aluminum plates, and metal.

Station layout

Exits
Exit 1: No. 18, Siyuan Rd., near Zhongzheng Rd. 
Exit 2: Zhongzheng Rd., near Dahan Bridge
Exit 3: Zhongzheng Rd.
Exit 4: Zhongzheng Rd., near Huacheng Rd.

Around the station
 Taipei Hospital (550m northwest of Exit 1)
 IKEA, Xinzhuang Branch (300m northeast of Exit 3)
 Hetai Auto Co., Xinzhuang Research Center
 Dahan Bridge (south of Exit 2)

References

Zhonghe–Xinlu line stations
Railway stations opened in 2012
Circular line stations (Taipei Metro)